Kech may refer to:

Places
Kech, Khyber Pakhtunkhwa, Pakistan
Kech District, Balochistan, Pakistan
Kech River, in Iran and Pakistan
 Kech, Iran (disambiguation), the alternative spelling of several places in Iran

Other uses
KECH-FM, a radio station in Idaho, U.S.

See also

Kek (disambiguation)
Ketch, a sailboat
Makran, a coastal strip in Balochistan, in Pakistan and Iran, called Kech Makran on the Pakistani side